Manuel Ponce's Violin Concerto was composed in 1943 and premiered on August 20 by Henryk Szeryng and the Mexico Symphony conducted by Ponce's former pupil Carlos Chávez. It was the last of his three concertos (the other ones for guitar, and for piano), written five years before his death. It lasts c. 30 minutes and consists of an eclectic Allegro, a lyrical Andante discreetly quoting his 1910 song Estrellita and a joyful Vivo. Mexican dance elements are integrated in the first movement's framework and evident in the finale.

Allegro non troppo
Andante espressivo
Vivo giocoso

Discography
 Henryk Szeryng // Polish National Radio Symphony — Jan Krenz. Prelude. 
 Henryk Szeryng // Colonne Concerts Orchestra — Ernest Bour. Odeon, 1951.
 Henryk Szeryng // Royal Philharmonic — Enrique Bátiz. EMI, 1985
 Miranda Cuckson // Czech National Symphony — Paul Freeman. Centaur, 1999

References

Compositions by Manuel Ponce
1943 compositions
Ponce